Toucheng Township is an urban township in Yilan County, Taiwan. The township includes Guishan Island and Guiluan Island in the Philippine Sea. The Senkaku Islands, known in Mandarin as the Diaoyu Islands, are claimed as part of the township.

History

Toucheng was formerly called Thau-ui. Toucheng Township was established on 9 September 1946. Toucheng Township was upgraded to an urban township on 1 January 1948.

Geography

 Area: 100.89 km2
 Population: 28,438 people (February 2023)

Administrative divisions
Toucheng includes twenty-five urban villages:

Education
 Lan Yang Institute of Technology

Infrastructure

Submarine communication cables
Toucheng is one of the two cable landing points of Taiwan island (the other one is Fangshan). Four submarine communication cables, including APCN, APCN2, RNAL, and SEA-ME-WE 3, connect here.

Tourist attractions

The township has several fresh seafood restaurants and also black sand beach for surfing activities.

Several boat operators offer trips from the Wushish Harbor to Guishan Island and also for whale and dolphin watching.

The Juh-an River Bird sanctuary is another attraction of Toucheng.

Once the economic center of the area, the Ho-Ping street in Toucheng is one of the few unaltered and typical Qing dynasty Taiwanese urban structures.

 Beiguan Crabs Museum
 Beiguan Tidal Waves
 Caoling Historic Trail
 Guishan Island
 Hedung Hall Lions Museum
 Honeymoon Bay
 Lanyang Museum
 Lee Rong-chun Literary Museum
 Old Dali Bridge
 Old Tsau Ling Tunnel
 Sea Eroded Rock Formation
 Shihpai Boundary Park
 Taoyuan Valley
 Toucheng Leisure Farm
 Toucheng Old Street

Transportation

Toucheng is served by the Yilan Line of Taiwan Railway Administration on Dali Station, Daxi Station, Dingpu Station, Guishan Station, Sicheng Station, Toucheng Station and Wai-ao Station. Toucheng has more rail stations (three) than any other townships in Taiwan. There are seven stations along the route.

The township has recently seen a marked increase in tourism due to the opening of the Freeway 5 linking it with western Taipei. The freeway consists of a series of tunnels dug through the Snow Mountains, the longest of which measures . The distance between western Taipei and Toucheng is now  and takes roughly thirty minutes of driving, compared to several hours in the past.

Wushi Harbor is located in the township.

Notable natives
 Lu Kuo-hua, Magistrate of Yilan County (2005-2009)

See also
 List of Taiwanese superlatives

References

External links

  

Townships in Yilan County, Taiwan